Khayyat Mahalleh (also Romanized as Khayyāţ Maḩalleh; also known as Khayyāţeh Maḩalleh) is a village in Siahkalrud Rural District, Chaboksar District, Rudsar County, Gilan Province, Iran. At the 2006 census, its population was 730, in 214 families.

References 

Populated places in Rudsar County